The Cadets can refer to one of the following:

 The Cadets Drum and Bugle Corps
 The Cadets (group), an American doo-wop group
 The Cadets (TV series) - 10-part Russian TV series dealing with the Battle of Stalingrad